Dance science is the scientific study of dance and dancers, as well as the practical application of scientific principles to dance. Its aims are the enhancement of performance, the reduction of injury, and the improvement of well-being and health.

Overview
Dance medicine and science as a field of study developed in the 1970s and '80s out of the field of sports medicine. In the early 1980s, the American Dance Festival (ADF) started including dance medicine courses in their coursework for dancers. When ADF moved to Duke University, physicians from Duke University Hospital became interested in dancers. Then, in 1990, the International Association for Dance Medicine and Science (IADMS) was formed by an international group of dance medicine practitioners, dance educators, dance scientists, and dancers. Membership of IADMS began with 48 members in 1991, and has grown to over 900 members in 35 countries as of 2016.

Dance science as an academic discipline has been evolving over the past 20 years. In the United Kingdom, three degrees (at master's level) now exist: one at the University of Bedfordshire, one at the University of Wolverhampton, and one at the Trinity Laban Conservatoire of Music and Dance in London. With regards to dance research, another UK institution which has staff and students active in the area is the University of Birmingham. Some undergraduate degrees in dance, or other dance courses, also include one or several modules in dance science, with the aim of promoting healthy dance practices. These include the University of Wolverhampton, the Royal Academy of Dance, and Bird College.

Several universities in the United States also offer dance science courses as part of their dance curriculum, accommodating both undergraduate and graduate-level students. These include, but are not limited to: Cornish College of the Arts, Columbia College of Chicago, California State - Long Beach, Elon University, Florida State University, Goucher College, Long Island University - Brooklyn Campus, Ohio State University, Ohio University, Texas A&M University, UCLA - Irvine, University of Colorado, University of Illinois - Urbana Champaign, the University of Oregon, and the University of South Florida.

Typically, the subject areas within dance science are similar to those studied in "sports science", though naturally with a focus on dance and the special considerations that this involves. They include: physiology, anatomy, kinesiology, psychology, biomechanics, nutrition, and similar. However, unlike sports science, dance science sometimes also studies related topics such as creativity and somatic techniques, including the practices of Pilates, yoga, Alexander technique, Feldenkrais method, etc.

Some dance companies employ dance scientists to provide support services, such as physiological testing, psychological support, conditioning and nutritional counseling. Such professionals include physical therapists, nutritionists, pilates instructors, massage therapists, and dance medicine physicians. Dancers that are not employed by a dance company that offers rehabilitation benefits on-site can sometimes have access to such facilities within their city of residence. 

The largest organization promoting dance science internationally is the International Association for Dance Medicine and Science (IADMS). As well as producing a scientific peer-reviewed journal, Journal of Dance Medicine and Science, it also holds an annual conference. The Performing Arts Medicine Association (PAMA), which holds its annual symposium in Aspen-Snowmass, Colorado, is a unique organization that concerns itself with the injuries and health issues of musicians as well as dancers. In the UK, DanceUK is perhaps the foremost proponent of dance science and healthy dance practice more generally. A conference entitled "From Cognition to Conditioning" was held at Middlesex University in February 2007.

See also
Dance and health
Dance research
Sports science

References

External links

International Association for Dance Medicine & Science (IADMS)
Journal of Dance Medicine & Science
Dance Science at Laban
 Dance Science at the University of Bedfordshire
Performing Arts Medicine Association
Harkness Center for Dance Injuries, NYU-Hospital for Joint Diseases, NYU Langone Medical Center
Westside Dance Physical Therapy
Dance Science Academy of Japan

 
Science
Science
Applied sciences